Krzysztof Brede (born 8 February 1981) is a Polish football manager and former player who played as a forward. He currently serves as manager of I liga club Chojniczanka Chojnice.

He spent most of his career playing with Lechia Gdańsk, also making appearances with Arka Gdynia, Warmia Grajewo, Gryf Wejherowo and Olimpia Grudziądz.

Playing career

Early years
Brede started his career with the youth teams of Lechia Gdańsk, moving to Lech Poznań during the summer of 2000. After a season with Lechia he spent 6 months on loan at Arka Gdynia making 8 appearances in total, leaving Lech at the end of the season. He spent a season with Warmia Grajewo, with Brede playing in a memorable cup game against ŁKS Łódź, with the team securing an unlikely draw after extra time, before losing in penalties. The season after Brede played with Gryf Wejherowo.

Lechia Gdańsk
During the summer of 2004 Brede joined Lechia Gdańsk, making his debut against the Pogoń Szczecin second team on 11 September 2004. In his first season with Lechia he played 21 times, contributing 2 goals as Lechia won the league. Brede spent the next 3 seasons with Lechia in the II liga playing 62 appearances during this period. Brede made 3 appearances for Lechia as they won promotion back to the Ekstraklasa for the first time as an independent club in 20 years. With Lechia in the Ekstraklasa Brede found himself playing with the Under 21's team.

Later years
After finding himself out of the first team, Brede joined Olimpia Grudziądz during the winter transfer window. In his first season he helped Olimpia to win the III liga. In total for Olimpia Brede made 77 appearances scoring one goal. In 2011 Brede returned to Lechia, this time to play with the Lechia Gdańsk II team. After a season in which he made 26 appearances Brede retired from professional football.

Coaching

Coaching career
Brede started coaching shortly after his retirement joining the Lechia Gdańsk coaching team in June 2012. He left in March 2014, joining the Jagiellonia Białystok coaching set up in June the same year.

Managerial career
After three years with the Jagiellonia team Brede joined Chojniczanka Chojnice in his first managerial job. Brede was given the position as manager on a one-year contract with an extension if the team were to win promotion. After a 4th-place finish his contract was not renewed and Brede left at the end of the season. Brede was not out of employment for long, securing the role of being Podbeskidzie Bielsko-Biała's manager. In his first season with Podbeskidzie the team finished 6th.

He won promotion with Podbeskidzie to Ekstraklasa in 2020. In December 2020, his contract was terminated.

On 24 November 2022, Chojniczanka appointed Brede as manager for the second time, on a year-and-a-half contract.

Honours
Lechia Gdańsk
II liga: 2007–08
III liga (group II): 2004–05

Olimpia Grudziądz
III liga (Podlasie-Warmian-Masurian group): 2008–09

References

1981 births
Living people
Sportspeople from Pomeranian Voivodeship
Polish footballers
Association football forwards
Lechia Gdańsk players
Lechia Gdańsk II players
Lech Poznań players
Arka Gdynia players
Warmia Grajewo players
Gryf Wejherowo players
Olimpia Grudziądz players
I liga players
II liga players
III liga players
Polish football managers
Podbeskidzie Bielsko-Biała managers
Ekstraklasa managers
I liga managers